Myddleton is a surname. Notable people with the surname include:

George Frederick Myddleton Cornwallis-West (1874–1951), British officer of the Scots Guards
Hugh Myddleton, 1st Baronet (1560–1631), Welsh goldsmith, clothmaker, banker, entrepreneur, mine-owner and self-taught engineer
Ririd Myddleton, MVO DL JP (1902–1988), country gentleman and one-time member of the Royal Household
William H. Myddleton or Arnold Safroni-Middleton (born 1873), British composer, director, violinist, harpist, writer and amateur astronomer

See also
Middlestone
Middleton (disambiguation)
Midleton